Robin Gianattassio-Malle is an American journalist and producer specializing in the use of aural and visual media and is Founder and Executive Director of Blue Egg Media,  established in 2008.

Gianattassio-Malle lives and works in the San Francisco Bay Area. A former Director of The Center for Word, Text and Image, she is  currently a visiting Professor in the Department of Design and Technology at the San Francisco Art Institute and at the California College of the Arts (CCA), where she teaches courses using interview as a medium for the Upper Division Interdisciplinary Department as well as the Visual Criticism Department.

Education

Gianattassio-Malle earned a Bachelor of Fine Arts and a Master of Fine Arts from the San Francisco Art Institute San Francisco, California.
In 2000, she was one of twelve journalists awarded a John S. Knight Professional Journalism Fellowship,  at Stanford University in Stanford, California where she conducted independent research and participated in J.S. Knight journalism seminars and discussions with Donald Kennedy, Condoleezza Rice, and Anna Deavere Smith.

Journalism career
Gianattassio-Malle’s career began as a reporter, producer and host with the National Public Radio (NPR) and Pacifica Network and was a founding member of the KPFA apprenticeship program, recently rebranded as First Voice Media. 
 
In 1988, Gianattassio-Malle became the founding producer and director of Forum, a live two-hour daily live call-in program at NPR Affiliate San Francisco KQED-FM.  Gianattassio-Malle produced and reported on a wide range of issues that focused on local, national and international affairs and developments in business, politics, technology, arts and sciences.
  
Several media arts awards were given to Gianattassio-Malle in the early 1990s from the National Endowment for the Arts (NEA) to produce: Silver Threads 1989, Weaving New Images of Aging, a documentary featuring women from around the globe, Original Treasure 1990, a radio documentary on inter-generational friendship and TimeIn TimeOut 1993, a documentary on living with life-threatening illness. 
During that same period, Gianattassio-Malle produced and directed The Persian Gulf: A National Debate, hosted by Alex Chadwick and distributed via satellite over the NPR network.

During the mid-nineties, Gianattassio-Malle produced and guest hosted the Commonwealth Club of California, a national weekly radio broadcast with topics ranging from politics, culture, society and economics, distributed to over seventy-five radio stations throughout the United States. 
 
Later, Gianattassio-Malle was awarded the World Affairs Council of Northern California, Asilomar Media Fellowshipand the Corporation of Public Broadcasting, Multi-cultural Producer Forum Fellowship. 
 
In 2010, Gianattassio-Malle received a fellowship from Carnegie Mellon University, STUDIO for Creative Inquiry.  Gianattassio-Malle’s residency at the STUDIO, produced a multimedia public interest program focused on the Marcellus Shale natural gas reserves in Pennsylvania, the economic development, and the environmental and social impact on the region.

References

American women journalists
California College of the Arts faculty
Living people
Year of birth missing (living people)
American women academics
21st-century American women